The OFC Beach Soccer Nations Cup is the main championship for beach soccer in Oceania, contested between the senior men's national teams of the members of the Oceania Football Confederation (OFC). It is the sport's version of the better known OFC Nations Cup in association football.

The winners of the championship are crowned continental champions; the tournament also acts as the qualification route for Oceanian nations to the upcoming edition of the FIFA Beach Soccer World Cup and is therefore also known as the FIFA Beach Soccer World Cup OFC qualifier. Coinciding with the annual staging of the World Cup, the competition took place yearly until 2009; the World Cup then became biennial, and as its supplementary qualification event, the championship followed suit.

The championship was established in 2006 after FIFA made it a requirement for all confederations to begin holding qualification tournaments to determine the best national team(s) in their region and hence those who would proceed to represent their continent in the upcoming World Cup (previously, nations were simply invited to play). FIFA currently allocate Oceania one berth at the World Cup and hence only the winners qualify to the World Cup finals.

Oceania's governing body for football, the OFC, organise the championship. Cooperation has also come from Beach Soccer Worldwide (BSWW), particularly in the initial tournaments. The competition was held under the title of the OFC Beach Soccer Championship until 2019 when the name was changed to OFC Beach Soccer Nations Cup, bringing it in line with the naming of other OFC senior national tournaments.

The Solomon Islands are the most successful nation with four titles. Tahiti are the current champions. These two nations are the only teams to qualify to the World Cup thus far.

Results
For all tournaments, the winners qualified for the FIFA Beach Soccer World Cup.

Performance

Successful nations

* = Hosts

Awards

All-time top goalscorers
As of 2019

The following table shows the all-time top 15 goalscorers.

All-time table
As of 2019

Key:
Appearances App / Won in normal time W = 3 points / Won in extra-time W+ = 2 points / Won on penalty shoot-out WP = 1 point / Lost L = 0 points

Appearances & performance timeline
The following is a performance timeline of the teams who have appeared in the OFC Beach Soccer Championship and how many appearances they each have made.
Legend

 – Champions
 – Runners-up
 – Third place
 – Fourth place
5th – Fifth place

× – Did not enter
•• – Entered but withdrew
 – Hosts
Apps – No. of appearances 

Timeline

Performance of qualifiers at the World Cup

The following is a performance timeline of the OFC teams who have appeared in the Beach Soccer World Cup since being sanctioned by FIFA in 2005.

Legend

 – Champions
 – Runners-up
 – Third place
 – Fourth place
 – Hosts

QF – Quarter-finals
R1 – Round 1 (group stage)
q – Qualified for upcoming tournament
Total – Total times qualified for World Cup

Notes

References

External links
OFC, official website

 
OFC
Oceania Football Confederation competitions
Oceanian championships
Beach soccer competitions
Recurring sporting events established in 2006